Willy Greiner (14 June 1919 – 25 February 2000) was a Norwegian politician for the Conservative Party.

He was mayor of Bærum from 1968 to 1978.

Outside of politics, he was a chief of department at Norsk Hydro.

1919 births
2000 deaths
Conservative Party (Norway) politicians
Mayors of places in Akershus
Bærum politicians